David Vincent Hayes was a professional American football player who played wide receiver for two seasons for the Rock Island Independents and Green Bay Packers.

References

1896 births
1956 deaths
American football wide receivers
Rock Island Independents players
Green Bay Packers players
Notre Dame Fighting Irish football players
St. Thomas (Minnesota) Tommies men's ice hockey coaches